The 1922 Argentine general election was held on 2 April 1922, in which Marcelo T. de Alvear was elected to the office of the president representing the Radical Civic Union (UCR).  Voter turnout for the election was 55.3%, with the UCR garnering a plurality at 51% of the popular vote and carrying 9 of the 14 provinces of Argentina.

Background
Hipólito Yrigoyen's presidency had been marked by massive contradictions. One of the founders in 1891 of Argentina's first successful pluralist party, the Radical Civic Union (UCR), Yrigoyen filled 5 of his 8 cabinet positions with conservatives from the party that had monopolized power since 1874, the National Autonomists. He expounded on the virtues of "true suffrage," but removed 18 willful governors - including 4 of the UCR's own. He mediated numerous labor conflicts; but proved unable to control police and military brutality against striking workers. The resulting wave of violence was compounded by the creation of the paramilitary Argentine Patriotic League by a reactionary faction in the Argentine upper class, while Yrigoyen (and the courts) remained largely silent on these developments. Over two thousand strikers perished - some burned alive in silos.

Still, he advanced an array of reforms, including the country's first meaningful pension, collective bargaining and land reform laws, as well as expanded access to higher education and the creation of the first significant State enterprise (the oil concern, YPF). Argentina's economy rebounded strongly from World War I-related shortages of goods and credit, and Yrigoyen's vigorous labor policy helped translate this into record living standards.

Yrigoyen prepared to leave office, though not the reins of power; beset by growing rivalries within the UCR itself, he turned to one of the co-founders of the UCR: the Ambassador to France, Marcelo Torcuato de Alvear. The scion of one of Argentina's traditional landed families, the well-mannered Alvear placated Yrigoyen's fears of losing control over his Radical Civic Union, a risk Yrigoyen insured himself against by placing his personal friend and former Buenos Aires Police Chief Elpidio González as Alvear's running mate. 
The conservative  opposition in Congress that had dogged Yrigoyen early in his tenure had largely been overcome by 1920 through a string of electoral victories. The Senate, however, which was indirectly elected at the time, firmly entrenched in conservative hands only by a series of removal decrees that left 9 vacancies by 1922.

Most other important parties followed suit and, rather than put forth their paramount figures as candidates, they fell back on backbenchers with a reformist bent. Conservatives formed an alliance, the National Concentration, but did not nominate their most prominent figure, former Buenos Aires Province Governor Marcelino Ugarte. They instead nominated instead a respected reformer, criminal law attorney, named Norberto Piñero. Piñero had helped a needed overhaul of Argentina's penal code in 1890, a record his backers hoped could, in voters' minds, separate the hastily formed National Concentration from its ties to the violent Argentine Patriotic League. An increasingly respected Lisandro de la Torre who had been unable to promote his Democratic Progressive Party into an effective centrist alternative to the UCR, chose former Education Minister Dr. Carlos Ibarguren as the nominee. Argentine Socialists, led by Senator Juan B. Justo, nominated one of his closest collaborators, and, a leader in Argentina's cooperative movement, the respected Deputy Nicolás Repetto.

The abbreviated campaign resulted in another, landslide victory for the UCR. The party retained the Presidency overwhelmingly, and won 53 of the 82 Congressional seats at stake, losing only in two provinces controlled by provincial parties, and two controlled by dissident UCR groups; the only Senate race, that of the City of Buenos Aires, was again won by the UCR, as well, and the party ended with 15 of 27 sitting Senators (protracted vacancies excluded).  Ambassador Alvear, for his part, did not campaign at all - receiving news for the April 2 results precisely where he received President Yrigoyen's phone call offering him the nomination: in the Argentine Ambassador's residence in Paris.

Candidates
 Radical Civic Union (populist): Ambassador to France Marcelo Torcuato de Alvear of the city of Buenos Aires
 National Concentration (conservative): Former Minister of Education Norberto Piñero of the city of Buenos Aires 
 Democratic Progressive Party (reformist): Former Minister of Justice Carlos Ibarguren of Salta Province
 Socialist Party: Deputy Nicolás Repetto of the city of Buenos Aires
 Independent UCR (anti-Yrigoyen): Miguel Laurencena of Entre Ríos Province

President

Popular Vote

Electoral Vote

Electoral Vote by Province

Chamber of Deputies

Notes

References

1922
1922 elections in South America
1922 in Argentina
1922